Giovanni Vusich (1647–1689) was a Roman Catholic prelate who served as Bishop of Nona (1688–1689).

Biography
Giovanni Vusich was born in Venice, Italy on 4 July 1647.
On 14 June 1688, he was appointed during the papacy of Pope Innocent XI as Bishop of Nona.
On 27 June 1688, he was consecrated bishop by Gasparo Carpegna, Cardinal-Priest of San Silvestro in Capite, with Stephanus Cosimi, Archbishop of Split, and Pier Antonio Capobianco, Bishop Emeritus of Lacedonia, serving as co-consecrators. 
He served as Bishop of Nona until his death in October 1689.

References

References 
 
  

17th-century Roman Catholic bishops in Croatia
Bishops appointed by Pope Innocent XI
1647 births
1689 deaths